St Carthage's Cathedral, Lismore is the cathedral church of the Roman Catholic Diocese of Lismore and the seat of the Bishop of Lismore, currently the Most Reverend Greg Homeming O.C.D.

History
The Diocese of Lismore (called the Diocese of Grafton until 1900) was created in 1887, and initially used the Church of St Mary in Grafton as its cathedral. When Jeremiah Doyle was consecrated as bishop of the new diocese on 28 August 1887, he chose to reside in Lismore, despite it being a small and insignificant outpost in the area. He began to work to petition Rome to change the name of the diocese and set about building a new cathedral.

He laid the foundation stone for the Lismore cathedral in 1892 and worked tirelessly to raise 40,000 pounds required to complete the project. A period of economic depression during the 1890s and the Australian banking crisis of 1893 meant several banks closed however, delaying any work on the project for several years. Work resumed in 1904 however a fire in 1905, which also destroyed the Presentation Convent and St Mary's School, delayed the project even further.

Despite the setback, Bishop Doyle borrowed money, using the Presentation Sisters (with whom he enjoyed a close working relationship) as guarantors. He would travel across the diocese five days a week collecting money and selling what he could to fund the cathedral's construction. The cathedral was built brick by brick as the money trickled in and was largely completed by 1907 when it was dedicated by Cardinal Francis Moran.

In 1908, Bishop Doyle travelled to his native Ireland and ordered twelve bells from Matthew O’Byrne, of the Fountain Head Bell Foundry in Dublin as a personal gift to the diocese. After returning to Australia, he unexpectedly died of cerebral haemorrhage in his house at Lismore, New South Wales, on 4 June 1909. He was buried at the cathedral in accordance with his wishes. The bells arrived following his death but because a bell tower had yet to be built, they remained on the docks. The Lismore Council agreed to pay for the bells and their installation in recognition of Bishop Doyle's enormous contribution to the civic life of the town. The tower was completed and in June 1911 the bells were consecrated.

Building name and design
St Carthage's Cathedral was named after the Cathedral in Lismore, located in County Waterford, Dublin, Ireland. The town of Lismore was not named after this city, but rather the small island of Lismore, one of the Inner Hebrides, in Scotland.

Herbert Wardell, son of famed architect William Wilkinson Wardell, was commissioned as the project's architect. He also worked on many other of Australia's cathedrals including St Patrick's Cathedral, Melbourne, St Mary's Cathedral, Hobart, and the rebuilt St Mary's Cathedral, Sydney. It was built in the nineteenth century Gothic Revival style, which was still commonly used into the twentieth century.

Renovations
In 1912, Bishop John Carroll added a pipe organ to the cathedral. Its altar of Australian marble was added in 1919. In 1937, Bishop Carroll dedicated a mosaic shrine that honours St Patrick.

In 1977, a rearrangement and extension of the Cathedral sanctuary was commenced under Bishop John Satterthwaite to better accommodate the celebration of Mass in accordance with the Church's liturgical reforms following the Second Vatican Council.

In late 2003, Australian architectural historian Brian Andrews was commissioned by Bishop Geoffrey Jarrett to survey the interior of the cathedral and devise a renovation plan, that would retain the integrity of the Wardell building, in continuity with the vision  of Bishop Doyle, to provide for the celebration of the renewed liturgy. In 2007, the cathedral was seriously damaged by hail. Andrews' report formed the basis for an extensive exterior repair and interior restoration between 2010 and 2015.

Flooding
In 2022, Lismore and other parts of northern New South Wales and South-East Queensland were flooded. The Wilson River in Lismore reached 14.37 metres at its peak, the largest flood since modern records began. Despite the cathedral sitting on a hill, water flooded the building, moving the heavy timber pews but not damaging the sanctuary. The damage and delayed cleanup following a second large flood just a few months later meant the cathedral was unable to be used for several months. As of August 2022, it is still not being used and masses are instead being held at the Carmelite Monastery at Goonellabah.

References

See also

Roman Catholic cathedrals in New South Wales
19th-century Roman Catholic church buildings in Australia
20th-century Roman Catholic church buildings in Australia